Stipan is a masculine given name cognate to Stjepan (Stephen), used by ikavian speakers.

Notable people with the name include:

 Stipan Blažetin, Hungarian-Croatian writer
 Stipan Dora, Bunjevac wrestler from Serbia
 Stipan Đurić, Hungarian-Croatian actor and singer
 Stipan Konzul, Croatian Protestant writer

See also
 Sustipan
 Stipanić
 Stipanići
 Stipanović
 Stipančević

Croatian masculine given names